United States military chaplains hold positions in the armed forces of the United States and are charged with conducting religious services and providing counseling for their adherents. As of 2011, there are about 2,900 chaplains in the Army, among the active duty, reserve, and National Guard components.

Organization
Within the United States Department of Defense, the Armed Forces Chaplains Board (AFCB) advises the Secretary of Defense and the Under Secretary of Defense for Personnel and Readiness on religious, ethical, and moral matters, as well as policy issues affecting religious ministry and the free exercise of religion within the military services. The three Chiefs of Chaplains and three active-duty Deputy Chiefs of Chaplains of the Army, Navy, and Air Force are its members.

A military chaplain must be endorsed by a religious organization in order to serve on active duty. In the contemporary U.S. military, endorsement is a complex area and many different paths are available. This religious endorsement must be maintained throughout the chaplain's military service and can be withdrawn at any time for religious or disciplinary reasons by the religious body with which the chaplain is affiliated, though provisions exist for exceptional cases. A military chaplain's rank is based on years of service and promotion selection from the appropriate peer group. Each is identified in uniform both by rank and religious affiliation insignia that indicate as well the branch of service.

History

Chaplains have served in the various branches of the United States armed forces since their formation, including in the Continental Army during the American Revolution. Congress authorized the hiring of an Army chaplain in 1791.  Reverend John Hurt of Virginia (who had served as Chaplain of the 6th Virginia Regiment during the American Revolution) was appointed to the position on March 4, 1791, and became the first officially recognized United States military chaplain.  He served until his resignation of April 30, 1794.  He was succeeded by Reverend David Jones of Pennsylvania who was also a veteran of service with the Continental Army during the American Revolution.  Jones served until he was discharged on 15 June 1800.  He later served as a chaplain during the War of 1812. Until 1862, only Christians were allowed to be chaplains in the US Army. After a lobbying campaign, the law was changed and President Lincoln appointed Rabbi Jacob Frankel of Philadelphia as the first Jewish chaplain on September 18, 1862. The first female chaplain in the United States military was Ella Elvira Gibson, she served in the American Civil War but she was not paid until 1876, and not recognized as a chaplain until 2002, when she was also posthumously given the rank of captain.

General Carl Spaatz, the first Air Force Chief of Staff, ordered the institution of a separate Air Force chaplaincy on May 10, 1949.

The U.S. Marine Corps and the U.S. Coast Guard do not have their own chaplaincies, but are served by the Navy Chaplain Corps.

Expanding role of military chaplains
In 1999, Rabbi Arnold E. Resnicoff, a U.S. Navy chaplain, proposed widening the chaplain's role to include that of engagement with local religious leaders in conflict zones to improve the military's understanding of local religious issues and include chaplains in the conflict prevention and reconciliation processes. This outreach is part of the duties listed for chaplains in Joint Publication 1-05 on chaplain operations.

The Military Association of Atheists & Freethinkers supports expanding chaplain services to support atheists and humanists. Whether they are already required to support such non-theists is disputed. Chaplains are not trained to provide such support and often oppose doing so.

Controversies

Constitutionality

Two Harvard law students brought a suit in 1979 arguing that military chaplains should be replaced with non-combat volunteers or contractors. In Katcoff v. Marsh (1985), the U.S. Court of Appeals for the Second Circuit determined that the plaintiffs lacked standing to bring the suit and upheld the right of the military to employ chaplains. According to one analysis of the case, the court analysis described the First Amendment's free exercise clause and establishment clause as separate issues. It noted that only the wealthiest religious sects could provide chaplains for their adherents, effectively denying to other military personnel the "free exercise" of their religion. The court also established guidelines for the military's chaplaincy programs, emphasizing the constitutional boundaries governing the program's administration and operations, including accommodating the rights and beliefs of each service member, and the avoidance of evangelizing and involuntary participation in religious observances. A contrary view holds that the military chaplaincy violates two requirements of the establishment clause, neutrality and non-entanglement, by promoting ecumenism, conflating military and religious functions, and controlling expenditures. It cited the difficulties faced by the Wisconsin Evangelical Lutheran Synod since World War II in attempting to service its adherents in the military outside of the chaplaincy program rather than submit to military authority.

Restrictions on religious observance or expression
A September 14, 2006, court-martial resulted in a reprimand and fine for U.S. Navy Chaplain Lieutenant Gordon Klingenschmitt, a Protestant, who participated in uniform at a March 2006 protest in front of the White House, though he had been given a direct order not to wear his uniform. The protest was in support of his and other chaplains' complaint that the military restricted the free exercise of their religion by allowing only non-sectarian prayers at public ceremonies.

Denominational favoritism
In August 2002, the U.S. District Court for the District of Columbia granted class action status to a lawsuit on the part of 17 evangelical Protestant chaplains who challenged the Navy's chaplain-selection criteria. They argued that the Navy adhered to a promotion formula that underrepresented "non-liturgical" Protestant chaplains by allotting positions in three equal parts—liturgical Protestant denominations such as Methodists, Lutherans, Episcopalians, and Presbyterians; Catholics; and non-liturgical Protestant denominations such as Baptists, evangelicals, Bible churches, Pentecostals, charismatics, and other faiths—although non-liturgical Protestants constitute far more than one-third of the Navy's service members.

In April 2007, the court held that the Navy had abandoned the thirds policy and that its current criteria were constitutional because the Navy has broad discretion to determine how to accommodate the religious needs of its service members. This decision was affirmed in 2008 by the United States Court of Appeals for the District of Columbia Circuit.

Proselytizing
Numerous complaints have been made against chaplains for mandatory prayers, coercion, and using government money to promote Evangelical Christianity. Atheists, whose religious position would not be represented by references to a generic God or in the "spiritual fitness" initiatives of the Army, have created groups to ensure the separation of church and state in the military. Groups representing atheists have advocated the appointment of a non-believer to the chaplaincy.

Sexual orientation
During the 1992 presidential campaign, the possibility of allowing gays and lesbians to serve openly in the U.S. military became a political issue. During the summer, Captain Larry H. Ellis, a Navy chaplain, sent senior military officers and senior chaplains his analysis that said: "In the unique, intensely close environment of the military, homosexual conduct can threaten the lives, including the physical (e.g. AIDS) and psychological well-being of others". He called the presence of homosexuals in the military a "physical and psychological" threat. Advocates of the policy objected that the Department of Defense might exploit Ellis' role as a chaplain in opposing the policy: "It's as if the religious attribution somehow gives their argument more credibility."

Chaplain groups and religious organizations took various positions on "Don't ask, don't tell" (DADT). Some felt that the policy needed to be withdrawn to make the military more inclusive. The Southern Baptist Convention battled the repeal of DADT, warning that their endorsements for chaplains might be withdrawn if the repeal took place. They took the position that allowing gay men and women to serve in the military without restriction would have a negative impact on the ability of chaplains who think homosexuality is a sin to speak freely regarding their religious beliefs. The Roman Catholic Church called for the retention of the policy, but had no plans to withdraw its priests from serving as military chaplains. Sixty-five retired chaplains signed a letter opposing repeal, stating that repeal would make it impossible for chaplains whose faith teaches that same-sex behavior is immoral to minister to military servicemembers. Other religious organizations and agencies called the repeal of the policy a "non-event" or "non-issue" for chaplains, claiming that chaplains have always supported military service personnel, whether or not they agree with all their actions or beliefs.

In May 2011, revelations that an April Navy memo relating to its DADT training guidelines contemplated allowing same-sex weddings in base chapels and allowing chaplains to officiate if they so chose resulted in a letter of protest from 63 Republican congressman, citing the Defense of Marriage Act (DOMA) as controlling the use of federal property. A Pentagon spokesperson replied that DOMA "does not limit the type of religious ceremonies a chaplain may perform in a chapel on a military installation", and a Navy spokesperson said that "A chaplain can conduct a same-sex ceremony if it is in the tenets of his faith". A few days later the Navy rescinded its earlier instructions "pending additional legal and policy review and interdepartmental coordination."

On September 30, 2011, Under Secretary of Defense Clifford Stanley announced the DOD's policy that military chaplains are allowed to perform same-sex marriages "on or off a military installation" where local law permits them. His memo noted that "a chaplain is not required to participate in or officiate a private ceremony if doing so would be in variance with the tenets of his or her religion" and "a military chaplain's participation in a private ceremony does not constitute an endorsement of the ceremony by DoD". Some religious groups announced that their chaplains would not participate in such weddings, including an organization of evangelical Protestants, the Chaplain Alliance for Religious Liberty and Roman Catholics led by Archbishop Timothy Broglio of the Archdiocese for the Military Services, USA.

Free speech

A January 5, 1991, letter  to the Abilene Reporter-News from Lieutenant Colonel Garland Robertson, a Southern Baptist U.S. Air Force chaplain who had served as a reconnaissance pilot during the Vietnam War, questioned the use of U.S. military force against Iraq. He wrote that "The need to use military force in this circumstance ... is an open issue."  When reprimanded, he wrote a lengthy rebuttal that he shared with the press. Air Force officials noted that he identified himself by rank to the newspaper, when he could have written as a private citizen. Robertson's orders to relocate to Germany were canceled. He submitted to three psychological examinations, and was relieved of his pastoral duties. He was honorably discharged without benefits in September 1993 based on a record of "poor leadership". He told the New York Times: "If you're consistent with the teachings of your church, there will always be tensions between being a minister and being an officer". He initiated a lawsuit and lost in both the District Court and the Tenth Circuit Court of Appeals, which found his free speech rights had not been violated, noted that "a chaplain is a member of both military and religious denomination institutions", and reaffirmed the lower court's finding "that the conflict between the Air Force and [Robertson] as an Air Force chaplain does not establish a constitutional violation of the religion clauses."

Chaplain deaths while on active duty
Death during service (combat and non-combat)

 Revolutionary War: 25
 War of 1812: 1
 Mexican–American War: 1
 Civil War
 Union: 117
 Confederacy: 41

 World War I: 23
 World War II: 182
 Korean War: 13
 Vietnam War: 15
 Iraq and Afghan Wars: 1 (as of September 2010)

Gallery

Military Chaplains Association
The Military Chaplains Association of the United States of America is dedicated to the religious freedom and spiritual welfare of our armed services members, veterans, their families, and their survivors. Founded in 1925, it received a congressional charter in 1950 by the 81st United States Congress.

See also

 Chaplain Corps (United States Army)
 United States Air Force Chaplain Corps
 United States Navy Chaplain Corps
 Chaplain of the United States Coast Guard
 Chaplain of the United States Marine Corps
 Episcopal Diocese of the Armed Services and Federal Ministries
 Four Chaplains
 Insignia of Chaplain Schools in the US Military
 Military chaplain
 New Testament military metaphors
 Religious symbolism in the United States military
 Roman Catholic Archdiocese for the Military Services, USA

Notes

Further reading
 Memoirs
 Jerry D. Aytry, Gun Totin' Chaplain (Airborne Press, 2006)
 A. D. Betts, Experience of a Confederate Chaplain 1861–1865
 Fr. Francis P. Duffy, Father Duffy's Story, (George H. Doran Company, 1919)
 James D. Johnson, Combat Chaplain: A 30-Year Vietnam Battle (University of North Texas Press, 2001)
 Maryniak, Benedict R. and John W. Brinsfield Jr., eds. 2007. The Spirit Divided: Memoirs of Civil War Chaplains. Macon, GA: Mercer University.
 Rev. Edmund B. Tuttle, Encounters with Indians: Experiences of a U.S. Army Chaplain in Wyoming Territory, 1867–1870
 

 Biography
 Stephen L. Harris, Duffy's War: Fr. Francis Duffy, Wild Bill Donovan, and the Irish Fighting 69th in World War I (Potomac Books, 2006)
 Israel A. S. Yost, Rebecca Salter, Monica Elizabeth Yost, Michael Markrich, Combat Chaplain: The Personal Story of the World War II Chaplain of the Japanese American 100th Battalion (University of Hawaii Press, 2006)

 General
 Warren B. Armstrong, For Courageous Fighting and Confident Dying: Union Chaplains in the Civil War (Lawrence: University Press of Kansas, 1998)
 Doris. L. Bergen, ed., The Sword of the Lord: Military Chaplains from the First to the Twenty-First Century (University of Notre Dame Press, 2004)
 Richard M. Budd, Serving Two Masters: The Development of American Military Chaplaincy, 1860–1920 (University of Nebraska Press, 2002)
 Cathey, M. Todd. 2017. Combat Chaplain: The Life and Civil War Experiences of Rev. James H. McNeilly. Macon, GA: Mercer University Press.
 Dom Aidan Henry Germain, Catholic Military and Naval Chaplains 1776–1917 (Washington, D.C., 1929)

 Hassner, Ron E., Religion in the Military Worldwide, Cambridge, MA: Cambridge University Press, 2013. .
 Hassner, Ron E., Religion on the Battlefield, Cornell, NY:  Cornell University Press, 2016.  .
 J. William Jones, Christ in the Camp: Religion in Lee's Army (Diggory Press)
 Anne C. Loveland, American Evangelicals and the U.S. Military, 1942–1993 (Louisiana State University Press, 1996)
 Robert Nay, "The Operational, Social, Religious Influences Upon The Army Chaplain Field Manual, 1926–1952" (Master's theses, U.S. Army Command and General Staff College, 2008)
 Herman Norton, Rebel Religion: The Story of Confederate Chaplains (St. Louis: Bethany Press, 1961)
 Albert Isaac Slomovitz, The Fighting Rabbis: Jewish Military Chaplains and American History (New York University Press, 1999)
 Willard L. Sperry, ed., Religion of Soldier and Sailor (Harvard University Press, 1945)
 Sybil Thornton, "Buddhist Chaplains in the Field of Battle" in Buddhism in Practice, ed. Donald S. Lopez Jr. (Princeton: Princeton University Press, 1995)
 Mark O'Malley, An History of the Development of Catholic Military Chaplaincy in the United States (Gregorian University, 2009)

External links

 Library of Congress audio and video history interviews of former US military chaplains

 
U